The Ohio Holocaust and Liberators Memorial is a bronze and steel Holocaust memorial installed on the Ohio Statehouse grounds, in Columbus, Ohio, United States. It was unveiled by Governor John Kasich and architect Daniel Libeskind on June 2, 2014.

Description

An inscription on the top of the stone wall reads: 

Another on the front of the wall reads:

See also

 2014 in art

References

External links
 

2014 establishments in Ohio
2014 sculptures
Bronze sculptures in Ohio
Downtown Columbus, Ohio
Holocaust memorials
Monuments and memorials in Ohio
Ohio Statehouse
Outdoor sculptures in Columbus, Ohio
Steel sculptures in Ohio